State Route 385 (SR 385) is a  southwest–to–northeast state highway that travels from Cornelia to Hollywood in the U.S. state of Georgia. The route is entirely within Habersham County. This highway travels concurrently with U.S. Route 441 Business (US 441 Business) from Cornelia to Clarkesville. The entire route travels along the historic route of US 441.

Route description 

SR 385 begins at an intersection with US 23/US 441/SR 15/SR 365 in Cornelia. At this intersection, US 441 Business/SR 105 head south toward Baldwin. US 441 Business/SR 105/SR 385 head northwest until Cannon Bridge Road, where SR 105 splits off to the northwest and the concurrency heads north toward Demorest. After passing through Demorest, the two highways enter Clarkesville. In town, at an intersection with East Louise Drive, US 441 Business departs to the northeast, while SR 385 continues into the main part of town. Less than  later, SR 17/SR 197 begin a concurrency into downtown. There, SR 17 splits off to the west, concurrently with SR 115. Just a slight distance later, SR 197 leaves to the northwest, while SR 385 travels through rural areas until it meets its northern terminus, an intersection with US 23/US 441/SR 15. This intersection also marks the northern terminus of SR 17 Alternate.

History

1920s and 1930s 
The roadway that would eventually become SR 385 was established in 1920 as SR 15 on the current route of SR 385 from Cornelia to Clarkesville  and on toward Clayton. At the same time, SR 13, part of what would become part of the current route of US 23/US 441/SR 15/SR 365, was built, and paved, from Cornelia to Toccoa. By 1926, the section from Cornelia to Clarkesville was paved. Between 1929 and 1932, US 23 was designated along SR 15 from Cornelia to the North Carolina state line. Also, all of US 23/SR 15 along this stretch was paved. Before February of that year, SR 17 was designated along the section of SR 13. In 1933, SR 17 was rerouted to travel from Toccoa to Hollywood.

1940s to 1990s 
By 1949, US 123's southern terminus was extended along SR 13 from Toccoa to Cornelia. By 1950, US 441 was extended along the entire portion of US 23/SR 15. By 1972, US 23 Business was designated along the current route of US 441 Business/SR 105 in Cornelia. In 1991, SR 365 was extended along the current path of US 23/US 441/SR 15. In 1992, US 441 (and presumably US 23/SR 15) was shifted to its current alignment, while the old route became US 441 Business. It is unclear if US 23 Bus. was redesignated as a southern extension of US 441 Bus. Also, SR 385 was designated from Clarkesville to Hollywood.

21st century 
, the Georgia Department of Transportation road map does not show any of SR 385 south of Clarkesville. Neither does it show whether the business route in Cornelia is US 23 Business or US 441 Business.

Major intersections

See also

References

External links 

 Georgia Roads (Routes 381 - 399)

385
Transportation in Habersham County, Georgia
U.S. Route 441